John Carpenter Hull (November 1, 1870 – January 7, 1947) served the state of Massachusetts for twenty years between 1916 and 1936 at the  Statehouse in Boston chairing the committees of Education, Judiciary, Elections and Public Institutions. He was also the Speaker of the House of  Massachusetts from 1925-1928, educator, lawyer, and the first Securities Director of Massachusetts.

Career in education
Hull was the headmaster of Fryeburg Academy in Fryeburg, Maine from 1892 to 1895, and the principal of North Adams, Massachusetts High School from 1895 to 1902, Milford, Massachusetts High School from 1902 to 1906, and Leominster, Massachusetts High School from 1906 to 1911.

On Serving the Commonwealth of Massachusetts as Speaker of the House

House of Representatives, July 25, 1928, Hull began the closing remarks:  “For these expressions of your goodwill, I sincerely thank you. Through your courtesy I have had the privilege and honor of being the Speaker of this House during the past four years. That is a privilege I have appreciated and enjoyed. That is an honor that can of necessity be conferred upon only a few of Massachusetts’ citizens, and I prize very greatly the thought that my name is now added to the list of my distinguished predecessors.”

First Securities Director of Massachusetts

In 1928, he entered into an eight person race for Lieutenant Governor of Massachusetts. Treasurer William S. Youngman won the highly competitive primary election by 21,099 votes over Speaker of the Massachusetts House of Representatives John C. Hull.

Hull was the first Securities Director, appointed January 1930.  At the Massachusetts Statehouse, Hull authored and introduced a bill to the committee on Banks and Banking in the Massachusetts House of Representatives the law relative to the sale of securities (Chapter 110A), on May 4, 1932. In House No. 1417 Hull wrote the following:  “Section 20. The commission shall investigate all complaints as to the sale of fraudulent securities or the fraudulent sale of securities or the violation of any of the provisions of this chapter as shall be referred to it, and shall report such violations to the attorney general if it considers the public interest so requires.” His term would end in 1936.

The Boston Stock Exchange rivaled the New York Stock Exchange during Wall Street Crash of 1929 and the Great Depression. Hull was helpful in the passing of the Securities Exchange Act of 1934 with his wars on "unlisted securities" and “The New York Curb Exchange” giving testimony to the US Senate (Sen. Duncan Upshaw Fletcher) for work on the Pecora Commission. The Pecora Commission revealed that neither Albert H. Wiggin (born Medfield MA) nor J. P. Morgan Jr. paid any income taxes in 1931 and 1932; a public outcry ensued.

The "Fidelity Fund" became Fidelity Investments under  Edward C. Johnson II; incorporated in Massachusetts, May 1, 1930. During the Great Depression, the "Fidelity Fund" was the only fund approved by Hull in his term in office as Securities Director for Massachusetts.

Personal life
Hull was born November 1, 1870 in Deering, Maine. Hull married Harriet Emma Johnson on Christmas Day, 1896 in Deering, Cumberland, Maine.  Hull and his wife were the parents of a daughter and four sons. Two of which were active in World War II. LCDR  Raymond M. Hull - WWII, Navy and LCDR Alden Edwards Hull - WWII, Navy Air.

Education
Hull received his A.B. from Bowdoin College in 1892, he attended the University of Michigan Department of Law.

See also
 1915 Massachusetts legislature
 1917 Massachusetts legislature
 1918 Massachusetts legislature
 1919 Massachusetts legislature
 1920 Massachusetts legislature
 1921–1922 Massachusetts legislature
 1923–1924 Massachusetts legislature
 1925–1926 Massachusetts legislature
 1927–1928 Massachusetts legislature

References

Speakers of the Massachusetts House of Representatives
1870 births
People from Fryeburg, Maine
People from Leominster, Massachusetts
Massachusetts lawyers
Republican Party members of the Massachusetts House of Representatives
Bowdoin College alumni
University of Michigan Law School alumni
Harvard Law School alumni
School board members in Massachusetts
1947 deaths
Politicians from Portland, Maine